Jacob Blankenship (Greek: Γιάκομπ Μπλάνκενσιπ; born August 4, 1989) is a Greek-American professional basketball player. He is 2.08 m tall. He plays the power forward and the center position.

High school career
Blankenship played high school basketball at New Smyrna Beach, in New Smyrna Beach, Florida.

College career
Blankenship played college basketball at four different colleges, including Daytona State College, Santa Fe Community College, Mississippi Valley State and Southeastern University.

Professional career
Blankenship declared for the 2011 NBA Draft but later he withdrew, making himself automatic eligible at the 2012 NBA Draft. On November 21, 2011 he signed with VL Pesaro. Later that year, he joined Terceira of the Portuguese Basketball Premier League.

On September 27, 2012 he joined Once Caldas de Manizales of the Colombian Basketball League.

The following two years, Blankenship didn't play for any team.

After gaining a Greek passport, he signed on February 6, 2016 with the Greek A2 club Peristeri.

References

External links
Profile at realgm.com
Profile at espn.go.com

1989 births
Living people
American expatriate basketball people in Greece
American expatriate basketball people in Italy
American people of Greek descent
Basketball players from Florida
Centers (basketball)
Greek people of American descent
Daytona State Falcons men's basketball players
Mississippi Valley State Delta Devils basketball players
People from New Smyrna Beach, Florida
Peristeri B.C. players
Power forwards (basketball)
Victoria Libertas Pallacanestro players
American men's basketball players